Gemuendina stuertzi (named for Gemünden from where it was discovered) is a placoderm of the order Rhenanida, of the seas of Early Devonian Germany. In life, Gemuendina resembled a scaly ray with an upturned head, or a large-finned stargazer. G. stuertzi is often invoked as an example of convergent evolution- with its flat body and huge, wing-like pectoral fins it has a strong, albeit superficial similarity to rays. Unlike rays, however, both Gemuendina`s eyes and nostrils were placed atop the head, facing upward. Furthermore, G. stuertzi'''s upturned mouth would have enabled it to suction prey that swam overhead, rather than swallow sediment or suction prey out of the substrate like modern rays.
 
Unlike most other placoderm orders, such as the Antiarchs, or the Arthrodires, Gemuendina and its four other known relatives (or seven, if the three species of the ichthyolith genus Ohioaspis are confirmed to be rhenanids) had armor made up of a mosaic of unfused bony plates and scales. Because their armor was so fragile, few intact examples of rhenanids have survived in the fossil record. Because several regions of the Hunsruck lagerstätte were anoxic, thus free of scavenging organisms, intact, nearly pristine (albeit flattened) specimens of G. stuertzi have been found as a result. Also unlike other placoderms, it did not have the characteristic tooth plates of placoderms. Instead, it had star-shaped tubercle scales that allowed it to seize, then swallow fish and other animals that swam too close with its mouth.

Specimens of G. stuertzi ranged in size from 30 to 100 centimeters in length. In 1971, Erik Stensiö described a metre long specimen as a new species, "Broilina heroldi," which was later synonymized with Gemuendina.

References

 Janvier, Philippe.  Early Vertebrates  Oxford, New York: Oxford University Press, 1998.  
 Long, John A. The Rise of Fishes: 500 Million Years of Evolution'' Baltimore: The Johns Hopkins University Press, 1996.

External links
Paleos Rhenanida

Rhenanida
Placoderms of Europe
Placoderm genera

Hunsrück Slate fossils